Dixie is a census-designated place (CDP) in Walla Walla County, Washington, United States. The population was 197 at the 2010 census.

A post office called Dixie has been in operation since 1881. The community has one elementary school, which is part of the Walla Walla School District and feeds on to Pioneer Middle School and Walla Walla High School. Dixie derives its name from the eponymous song.

Geography
Dixie is located at  (46.140782, -118.153897).

According to the United States Census Bureau, the CDP has a total area of 0.5 square miles (1.3 km2), all of it land.

Demographics
As of the census of 2000, there were 220 people, 84 households, and 63 families residing in the CDP. The population density was 428.2 people per square mile (166.6/km2). There were 87 housing units at an average density of 169.3/sq mi (65.9/km2). The racial makeup of the CDP was 90.45% White, 3.64% Native American, 4.55% from other races, and 1.36% from two or more races. Hispanic or Latino of any race were 5.91% of the population.

There were 84 households, out of which 26.2% had children under the age of 18 living with them, 67.9% were married couples living together, 4.8% had a female householder with no husband present, and 25.0% were non-families. 20.2% of all households were made up of individuals, and 6.0% had someone living alone who was 65 years of age or older. The average household size was 2.62 and the average family size was 3.00.

In the CDP, the age distribution of the population shows 22.7% under the age of 18, 6.8% from 18 to 24, 25.5% from 25 to 44, 31.4% from 45 to 64, and 13.6% who were 65 years of age or older. The median age was 42 years. For every 100 females, there were 107.5 males. For every 100 females age 18 and over, there were 104.8 males.

The median income for a household in the CDP was $33,125, and the median income for a family was $40,714. Males had a median income of $29,583 versus $19,000 for females. The per capita income for the CDP was $24,650. About 7.1% of families and 9.9% of the population were below the poverty line, including 28.6% of those under the age of eighteen and none of those 65 or over.

References

Census-designated places in Washington (state)
Census-designated places in Walla Walla County, Washington